Ye Banished Privateers are a pirate band from Umeå, Sweden.

Their songs are inspired by traditional Irish and Scandinavian folk music and their lyrics are mostly based on events that happened in the 17th and 18th century. During their shows they portray a crew of pirates, wearing historical clothes and acting while playing, making the show itself a mix of music and theatre.

Biography 
The band was started in 2008 by Björn Malmros and Peter Mollwing, who gathered several other musicians with the idea of playing pirate folk music.

Today, the band amounts to nearly 30 members.

Their first self-produced album, Songs and Curses, was released on 19 September 2012 for the International Talk Like a Pirate Day.

After playing several shows in their home country, they started touring Germany in 2014.

In the same year, on 12 September, they released The Legend of Libertalia their second studio album, on Totentanz Records.

In 2015 and 2016 they toured mainly in Sweden, Germany and the Netherlands.

They announced their third album in 2016, but the release was delayed until 30 June 2017. First Night Back in Port finally came out when they signed a deal with Napalm Records.

In 2020 Ye Banished Privateers released their fourth album Hostis Humani Generis. The name of the album, Latin for "enemy of mankind" is a term that was often used to describe maritime pirates; outsiders of society and a threat to the status quo. Due to the coronavirus pandemic, the band was not able to release the album as planned and live-streamed a concert instead, an online event to which 12000 fans participated.

They released a Christmas special album titled A Pirate Stole My Christmas on December 3, 2021 which featured classics of the festival with a new pirate spin to them.

Discography 
Albums

2012 – Songs and Curses

2014 - The Legend of Libertalia (Totentanz Records)

2017 - First Night Back in Port (Napalm Records)

2020 - Hostis Humani Generis (Napalm Records)

2021 - A Pirate Stole my Christmas (Napalm Records)

Samplers

2013 – The Swashbuckling Sound of Pirates – Der Grosse Piraten Entertainment Markt – 20 pieces of Scurvy Seasongs (Totentanz Records)

2014 - Best of MPS 2014 (Totentanz Records)

Band members 
 Anders "Nobility" Nyberg - cembalo, celesta, pump organ and miniature piano
 Anton "Taljenblock" Teljebäck - viola pomposa, pump organ, brass trash, stone and muddy lawn
 Björn "Bellows" Malmros – accordion, harmonica, ocean drum, dholak, djembe, pottery and tabla
 Emil "Emilio du Monde" Nilsson-Mäki - lead vocals, duki tarang, guitar, double bass
 Eva "Eva the Navigator" Maaherra Lövheim - fiddle, octapad
 Frida “Freebird” Granström - fiddle, brass, trumpet and octapad
 Hampus "Monkey Boy" Holm - German style bass drum and octapad
 Hampus "Bojtikken" Larsson - cajón, percussion, octapad, bouzouki and guitar
 Ina Molin - cajón and dholak
 Linnéa Enberg - percussion and octapad
 Jens "Wan Chou Zhong" Tzan Choong - banjo, guitalele and sitar
 Jim "Silent Jim" Sundström - mandolino and electrobass
 Joel "Slagter-Lars" Löfwenius - guitar and synth bass
 Jonas "Hog Eye McGinn" Nilsson - 5-string banjo and madal
 Kristian "Good Christian" Persson Hodén - squeeze box
 Lisa "Bloody Liz" Carlsson - cajón and percussion
 Louise "Happy Lou" Gillman - fiddle and dance
 Magda "Magda Malvina Märlprim" Andersson - synthesizer and bouzouki
 Magnus "Val du Monde" Nilsson-Mäki - techno synthesizer, guitar, double bass
 Martin "Scurvy Ben" Gavelin - sawbone, cajón, morsing, Wah-wah pedal, crash, cripple and roll
 Mattias "Sickboy McCoy" Johansson - washboard, tambourines and scraps of metal
 Melker Häggbom "Father Silver" Klingberg - u-bass, double bass
 Niklas "Meat stick Nick" Boman - double bass and bass trombone
 Peter "Quartermaster Blackpowder Pete" Mollwing - questionable vocals
 Richard "Old Red" Larsson - u-bass, double bass, bouzouki and 12-string guitar
 Sara "Landmark" Lundmark - percussion and marching drum
 Sara "Major John" Wallin - recorder, shouts and ocean drum
 Stina Hake - recorder, dholak, whistles and cello
 William "Shameless Will" Hallin - lead chants and shouts

References

External links 
 Ye Banished Privateers official website
 Official Facebook page 
 Youtube channel

Swedish folk music groups
Irish folk music
Napalm Records artists